Satid Leangtanom (born 11 April 1929) was a Royal Thai Air Force instructor, with the rank of squadron leader when he wrote a 1970 textbook on wilderness survival training. As a middle-distance runner, He competed in the men's 1500 metres at the 1952 Summer Olympics.

References

External links
 

1929 births
Year of death missing
Satid Leangtanom
Athletes (track and field) at the 1952 Summer Olympics
Satid Leangtanom
Satid Leangtanom
Place of birth missing